View of the Canal Saint-Martin is an 1870 oil-on-canvas painting by Alfred Sisley, first exhibited at the Paris Salon of 1870. It was acquired by Gaudoin or Pierre-Firmin (both art dealers). It was then bought by Dr Paul Gachet for 170 francs before 1883. Gachet's son owned it from 1909 onwards and donated it to the Louvre in 1951. It is now in the Musée d'Orsay.

References

Paintings by Alfred Sisley
1870 paintings
Paintings in the collection of the Musée d'Orsay
Water in art